Molla Jamati (also Romanized as Mollā Jamātī) is a village in Howmeh Rural District, in the Central District of Minab County, Hormozgan Province, Iran. At the 2006 census, its population was 406, in 80 families.

References 

Populated places in Minab County